The Killabakh Nature Reserve is a protected nature reserve located in the Mid North Coast region of New South Wales, Australia. Flora includes wet sclerophyll eucalyptus forest and rainforest. The word Killabakh is derived from the Worimi language meaning “blue gum”, a common local species of tree.

The reserve is part of the Coxcomb, Goonook, and Killabakh Nature Reserves, a network of wilderness and other protected areas along the Great Eastern Escarpment of the Great Dividing Range which, combined, contributes significantly to the aim of the initiative to connect and conserve mountain ecosystems running the length of eastern Australia.

See also

 Protected areas of New South Wales

References 

Mid-Coast Council
Forests of New South Wales
Nature reserves in New South Wales
1999 establishments in Australia
Protected areas established in 1999